José María Bueno y Monreal (11 September 1904 – 20 August 1987) was a Spanish cardinal of the Catholic Church who served as Archbishop of Seville from 1957 to 1982, and was elevated to the cardinalate in 1958.

Biography
Born in Zaragoza, José Bueno studied at the Pontifical Gregorian University and the Angelicum in Rome. He was ordained to the priesthood on 19 March 1927, and then taught at the seminary and journalism school in Madrid until 1945. Becoming a professor at Madrid's Superior Institute of Religious Culture in 1929, Monreal also served as diocesan fiscal from 1935 to 1945, which was the same year he was made a doctoral canon.

On 1 December 1945, he was appointed Bishop of Jaca by Pope Pius XII. Monreal received his episcopal consecration on 19 March 1946 from Bishop Leopoldo Eijo y Garay, with Bishops Casimiro Morcillo González and Luigi Muñoyerro serving as co-consecrators. He was later named Bishop of Vitoria on 13 May 1950, and Coadjutor Archbishop of Seville and Titular Archbishop of Antiochia in Pisidia on 27 October 1954. As coadjutor, Monreal served under Cardinal Pedro Segura y Sáenz, who refused even to see Monreal and tried to stop his efforts to soften the Cardinal's strict rules for Sevillian Catholics.

Bueno y Monreal succeeded Cardinal Segura y Sáenz as Archbishop of Seville on 8 April 1957. He was created Cardinal-priest of Ss. Vito, Modesto e Crescenzia (pro hac vice to title) by Pope John XXIII in the consistory of 15 December 1958. From 1962 to 1965, Monreal attended the Second Vatican Council; along with Cardinal José Quintero Parra, he assisted Cardinal Paul Zoungrana in delivering one of the closing messages of the council on 8 December 1965. He was one of the cardinal electors who participated in the 1963 papal conclave, and again in the conclaves of August and October 1978. He resigned as archbishop of Seville on 22 May 1982, after a reign of twenty-five years.

Bueno y Monreal died in Pamplona, at age 82. He is buried in Seville Cathedral.

References

External links
Cardinals of the Holy Roman Church
Catholic-Hierarchy

1904 births
1987 deaths
People from Zaragoza
Pontifical Gregorian University alumni
20th-century Spanish cardinals
20th-century Roman Catholic archbishops in Spain
Participants in the Second Vatican Council
Roman Catholic archbishops of Seville
Cardinals created by Pope John XXIII